Karnaprayag Legislative Assembly constituency is one of the 70 assembly constituencies of  Uttarakhand a northern state of India. Karnaprayag is part of Garhwal Lok Sabha constituency.

Members of Legislative Assembly

See also
 Garhwal (Lok Sabha constituency)
Badrinath (Uttarakhand Assembly constituency)
Tharali (Uttarakhand Assembly constituency)

References

External links
  

 Chamoli
Assembly constituencies of Uttarakhand
2002 establishments in Uttarakhand
Constituencies established in 2002